"Radio 101" is a song recorded by Canadian country music artist Beverley Mahood. It was released in 1998 as the fourth single from her debut album, Girl Out of the Ordinary. It peaked at number 17 on the RPM Country Tracks chart in October 1998.

Chart performance

Year-end charts

References

Songs about radio
1998 songs
1998 singles
Beverley Mahood songs